Begu Khel is a town and union council of Lakki Marwat District in Khyber Pakhtunkhwa province of Pakistan. It is located at 32°31'51N 70°57'15E and has an altitude of 341 metres (1122 feet).

References

 

Union councils of Lakki Marwat District
Populated places in Lakki Marwat District